"Pickin' Up Strangers" is a song written by Byron Hill, and recorded by American country music artist Johnny Lee.  It was released in January 1981 and recorded the soundtrack of the feature film Coast to Coast, and was also the third single from Lee's album Lookin' for Love. The song won an ASCAP Award for being among the most performed country songs of 1981.

Chart performance

References

Johnny Lee (singer) songs
1981 songs
Songs written by Byron Hill
Song recordings produced by Jim Ed Norman
Full Moon Records singles
Asylum Records singles